The Cancionero de Palacio (Madrid, Biblioteca Real, MS II–1335), or Cancionero Musical de Palacio (CMP), also known as Cancionero de Barbieri, is a Spanish manuscript of Renaissance music. The works in it were compiled during a time span of around 40 years, from the mid-1470s until the beginning of the 16th century, approximately coinciding with the reign of the Catholic Monarchs.

The manuscript 
The first ten folios are not numbered; the remaining folios are numbered from 1 to 304. Based on the index of works included in the beginning of the manuscript, it originally had 548 works. Many folios have been lost, reducing the number of works currently in the manuscript to 458.

The manuscript was written by 9 different people and, in all, received 11 successive additions:
The first addition happened in the first years of the 16th century, most probably after 1505, as a result of the reorganization of the Court's musical chapel ordered by Ferdinand II of Aragon, one year after the death of Queen Isabella. This is the most numerous addition and its works are the most representative of the circumspect and expressive style characteristic of the reign of the Catholic Monarchs.
The next four additions were supposedly made between 1505 and 1510.
The next two were made around 1515.
The 8th addition was possibly made in 1516, right after the death of Ferdinand II.
The 9th happened between 1516 and 1517.
The 10th addition, from folios 293 to 304, consisted of a tiny cancionero written in a different kind of paper which was incorporated to the body of the main manuscript. The works contained in it are not listed in the original opening index, and two of its works were already present in the Cancionero. It possibly originated in the chapel of Joanna of Castile, in Tordesillas.
The last addition was made between 1519 and 1520, when the chapel of the Catholic Monarchs had already moved to other location.

By the end of the 19th century the manuscript was found in the Royal Library of the Royal Palace of Madrid by composer and musicologist Francisco Asenjo Barbieri, who transcribed and published it in 1890 with the title "Cancionero musical de los siglos XV y XVI" (Musical songbook of the 15th and 16th centuries).

Works 
The manuscript contains 458 works, the bulk of which are in Castilian, although a few works also appear in Latin, French, Catalan and Galician-portuguese. It constitutes an anthology of the polyphonic music performed during the reign of the Catholic Monarchs.

The themes found in the songs are the most varied: romantic, religious, festive, chivalrous, satirical, pastoral, burlesque, political, historical, etc. accompanied by music of all styles: from popular folk songs to elaborate compositions. The musical form most important is the villancico, though other genres are also found as the romance and the canción. The majority of the works are for one voice with instrumental accompaniment but polyphonic works are also available for 2, 3 or 4 voices.

Below is a list of the composers present in the manuscript, with the number of works in parentheses:

Juan del Encina (63)
Luis de Milán (23)
Gabriel Mena (18)
Pedro de Escobar (17)
Francisco de la Torre (15)
Juan Ponce (12)
Alonso de Mondéjar (11)
Francisco de Peñalosa (10)
Alonso (10)
Badajoz (8)
Jacobus de Milarte (6)
Pedro de Lagarto (4)
Juan de Anchieta (4)
Juan de Urrede (3)
Enrique (3)
Garcimuñoz (3)
Pedro Juan Aldomar (3)
Juan Alvárez de Almorox (3)
Alonso de Córdoba (3)
Alfonso de Troya (3)
Juan de Triana (3–2)
Juan Cornago (3–2)
Móxica (2)
Juan Pérez de Gijón (2)
Antonio de Ribera (2)
Bernaldino de Brihuega (2)
Alonso de Toro (2)
Antonio de Contreras (2)
Diego Fernández (2)
Juan de Sanabria (2)
Fernand Pérez de Medina (2)
Juan de Espinosa (2)
Josquin des Prez (1)
Alonso Pérez de Alba (1) 
Lope de Baena (1)
Ajofrín (1)
Diego de Fermoselle (1)
J. Rodríguez Torote (1)
Juan de Valera (1)
Lope Martínez (1)
Lucas Fernández (1)
Lucas (1)
Roma (1)
Salcedo (1)
Sant Juan (1)
Sedano (1)
Pedro Hernández de Tordesillas (1)
Vilches (1)
Juan de León (1)
Giovanni Brocco (1)
Giacomo Fogliano (1)
Bartolomeo Trombocino (1)

Complete list of works 
Three different indexing systems are used in the table below: 
Nº   = Index of works by title, in alphabetical order
Bar. = Index used by Barbieri in his 1890 publication
CMP = Index as found in the Cancionero. Because of the additions it received, there are duplicate works and many works not listed in the original index.

Concordance with other musical sources

Manuscripts 
CMB – Barcelona, Biblioteca de Catalunya, Ms 454 (Cancionero de Barcelona) (E-Bbc 454)
BBU – Bologne, Biblioteca Universitaria, Ms. 596.HH.2/4 (I-Bu 596.HH.2/4) (Tablature for keyboard)
Q16 – Bologne, Civico Museo Bibliografico Musicale, MS Q16 (I-Bc Q 16)
Q17 – Bologne, Civico Museo Bibliografico Musicale, MS Q17 (I-Bc Q 17)
Q18 – Bologne, Civico Museo Bibliografico Musicale, MS Q18 (I-Bc Q 18)
CHI – Chicago, The Newberry Library, Case MS VM C. 25 (US-Cn Case ms. VM 140 C.25) (Lute book by Vincenzo Capirola)
COI – Coimbra, Biblioteca Geral da Universidade, MS M.12 (P-Cug M.12)
CME – Elvas, Biblioteca Municipal Públia Hortênsia, Ms 11793 (Cancioneiro de Elvas) (P-Em 11793)
MA7 – Florence, Biblioteca Nazionale Centrale, Ms. Magl. XIX. 107 bis (I-Fn Magl.XIX 107 bis)
MA6 – Florence, Biblioteca Nazionale Centrale, Ms. Magl. XIX. 176 (I-Fn Magl.XIX 176)
MA8 – Florence, Biblioteca Nazionale Centrale, Ms. Magl. XIX. 178 (I-Fn Magl.XIX 178)
RIC – Florence, Biblioteca Riccardiana, MS. 2356 (I-Fr 2356)
LIS – Lisbon, Biblioteca Nacional Colecção Dr. Ivo Cruz, MS 60 (Cancioneiro de Lisboa) (P-Ln Res C.I.C. 60)
CMM – Madrid, Biblioteca de la Casa del Duque de Medinaceli, Ms 13230 (Cancionero de Medinaceli)
OXF – Oxford, Bodleian Library, MS. Ashmole 831 (GB-Ob Ashmole 831)
PAR – Paris, Bibliothèque École Nationale Supérieure des Beaux-Arts, Masson 56) (Cancioneiro de Paris) (F-Pba 56: Masson)
PIX – Paris, Bibliothèque Nationale, fonds française 15123 (Chansonnier Pixérécourt) (F-Pn 15123)
PBN – Paris, Bibliothèque Nationale, Ms Rés. Vm 676
PER – Perugia, Biblioteca Comunale Augusta, Ms. 431 (olim G20) (I-PEc 431)
CGC – Rome, Biblioteca Apostolica Vaticana, C. G.XIII. 2 7 (Cappella Giulia Chansonnier) (V-CVbav CG XIII.27 ).
GAL – Saint Gall, Stiftsbibliothek, MS 463 (CH-SGs 463) (Tschudi Liederbuch)
CMS – Segovia, Catedral, Archivo Capitular, s.s. (Cancionero de Segovia) (E-SE s.s)
CMC – Sevilla, Catedral Metropolitana, Biblioteca Capitular y Colombina, Ms. 7-I-28 (Cancionero de la Colombina) (E-S 7-I-28)
VER – Verona, Biblioteca Capitolare. MS 752 (I-VEcap 757)
TAR – Tarazona, Archivo Capitular de la Catedral, ms. 2/3 (E-TZ 2/3)

Printed books 
HAR – Harmonice Musices Odhecaton, A. O. Petrucci, Venice, 1501
FRO – Frottole Libro septimo. Petrucci
FR3 – Frottole Libro tertio. Petrucci
SPI – Intabulatura de lauto, libro primo. F. Spinacino, 1507
UPS – Cancionero de Uppsala
DEF – João IV de Portugal, "Defensa de la música moderna" (Lisbon, 1649)

Discography 

???? – [ANT] Obra Musical Completa de Juan del Enzina. M.A.Tallante. Pro Mvsica Antiqva de Madrid y solistas. M.E.C. 
???? – [MAY] Mayrat. El Viaje del Agua. Grupo Odres. Saga WKPD-10/2035.  
1960 – [ANG] Victoria de los Ángeles – Spanish Songs of the Renaissance. Victoria de los Ángeles. Barcelona Ars Musicae. José Maria Lamaña. . Se puede encontrar en CD ensamblado con otras grabaciones en: Victoria de los Ángeles – Cantos de España. EMI Classics 7243 5 66 937 2 2 (4 CDs).  
1968 – [RES] Music from the Time of Christopher Columbus. Musica Reservata. Philips 432 821-2 PM.  
1970 – [EMC] Music of the Royal Courts of Europe 1150–1600. Early Music Consort of London. David Munrow. Reeditado en CD como: The Pleasures of the Royal Courts. Elektra Nonesuch 9 71326-2. 
1971 – [VAL] El Camino de Santiago. Cantos de peregrinación. Escolanía y Capilla Musical de la Abadía del Valle de los Caídos. Leoncio Diéguez. Laurentino Saenz de Buruaga. Cuarteto y Grupo de Instrumentos Antiguos Renacimiento. Ramón Perales de la Cal. EMI (Odeón) 7243 5 67051 2 8.  
1973 – [MUN] Music from the court of Ferdinand and Isabella. Early Music Consort of London. David Munrow.. Se puede encontrar en CD ensamblado con otras grabaciones en: Music for Ferdinand and Isabella of Spain – Instrumemts of the Middle Ages & Renaissance. Testament SBT 1251 .  
1974 – [BER] Old Spanish Songs. Spanish songs from the Middle Ages and Renaissance. Teresa Berganza. Narciso Yepes. . Se puede encontrar en CD ensamblado con otras grabaciones en: Canciones españoles. Deutsche Grammophon 435 648-2.  
1974 – [JOC] Antik Musik på Wik – Early Music at Wik. Joculatores Upsaliensis. . Se puede encontrar en CD ensamblado con otras grabaciones en: Antik Musik på Wik – Early Music at Wik. Bis CD 3.  
1976 – [SPA] Weltliche Musik im Christlichen und Jüdischen Spanien (1450–1550). Hespèrion XX. Jordi Savall. Virgin Veritas Edition 61591 (2 CDs).  
1977 – [PAR] Ars Antiqua de Paris à la Sainte Chapelle. Ars Antiqua de Paris. Coda 9605-1.  
1979 – [ATR] Villancicos – Chansons populaires espagnoles des XVe et XVIe siècles. Atrium Musicae de Madrid. Gregorio Paniagua. Harmonia mundi "Musique d'Abord" HMA 190 1025. 
1980 – [MAD] La Spagna. 15th & 17th Century Spanish Variations. Atrium Musicae de Madrid. Gregorio Paniagua. Bis CD-163.  
1984 – [COM] Romeros y Peregrinos. Grupo Universitario de Cámara de Compostela. Carlos Villanueva. EMI Classics CB-067.  
1986 – [COH] L'homme armé: 1450–1650. Musique de guerre et de paix. Boston Camerata. Joel Cohen. Erato ECD 88168.  
1987 – [KIN] Music from the Spanish Kingdoms. Circa 1500 Ensemble. CRD 3447.  
1988 – [RIC] Music from the time of Richard III. Yorks Waits. Saydisc CD-SDL 364.  
1988 – [GEN] Musica dell'época di Cristoforo Colombo. I Madrigalisti di Genova. L. Gamberini. Ars Nova CDAN 173.  
1989 – [DAN] El Cancionero Musical de Palacio. Musik aus der Zeit der Katholischen Könige in Spanien, 1450–1550. Ensemble Danserye. Preiser Records 90028.  
1991 – [DAE] El Cancionero de la Catedral de Segovia. Ensemble Daedalus. Roberto Festa. Accent ACC 9176. 1991. Contiene Justa fue mi perdiçión.  
1991 – [HES] Juan del Encina: Romances y villancicos. Jordi Savall. Hespèrion XX. Astrée (Naïve) ES 9925.  
1991 – [PAL] El Cancionero de Palacio, 1474–1516. Música en la corte de los Reyes Católicos. Hespèrion XX. Jordi Savall. Astrée (Naïve) ES 9943.  
1991 – [CHR] From a Spanish Palace Songbook. Music from the time of Christopher Columbus. Margaret Philpot, Shirley Rumsey, Christopher Wilson. Hyperion "Helios" 55097.  
1991 – [CHA] Chansons – Danses – Musiques Médiévales et Renaissances. Ensemble Jehan de Channey. De plein Vent CD 1989–04.  
1992 – [NEF] Music for Joan the Mad. Spain 1479–1555. La Nef. Sylvain Bergeron. Dorian Discovery 80128.  
1992 – [WAV] 1492 – Music from the age of discovery. Waverly Consort. Michael Jaffee. EMI Reflexe 54506.  
1992 – Music From the Time of Columbus. Philip Pickett. New London Consort. Linn Records.
1993 – [ALT] In Gottes Namen fahren wir. Pilgerlieder aus Mittelalter und Renaissance. Odhecaton, Ensemble für alte Musik, Köln. FSM 97 208.  
1993 – [GOT] The Voice in the Garden. Spanish Songs and Motets, 1480–1550. Gothic Voices. Christopher Page. Hyperion 66653.  
1994 – [SEP] Sephardic Songs in the Hispano-Arabic tradition of medieval Spain. (Canciones Sefardies de la tradición hispanoárabe en la España medieval. Ballads of the Sephardic Jews). Sarband. Vladimir Ivanoff. Jaro 4206-2. Sonifolk 21 115. Dorian Recordings DOR-93190.  
1995 – [CAN] Canciones, Romances, Sonetos. From Juan del Encina to Lope de Vega. La Colombina. Accent 95111.  
1995 – [ROM] Al alva venid. Música profana de los siglos XV y XVI. La Romanesca. José Miguel Moreno. Glossa 920203.  
1995 – [CAM] Songs and dances from the Spanish Renaissance. Camerata Iberia. MA Records MA 035A.  
1995 – [THO] A Royal Songbook. Spanish Music from the time of Columbus. Musica Antiqua of London. Philip Thorby. Naxos 8.553325.  
1995 – [LAN] Landscapes. Three centuries of world music. David Bellugi et al. Frame 9506.  
1995 – [RON] A Song of David. Music of the Sephardim and Renaissance Spain. La Rondinella. Dorian Discovery DIS-80130.  
1995 – [REN] Odyssey. Progressive Performance of ancient songs. New World Renaissance Band. Nightwatch 1006.  
1995 – [ARA] Des Croisades à Don Quichotte. Musique du pourtour méditerranéen (XIIe-XVIe siècles). Ensemble vocal et instrumental Arabesque. Domitille de Bienassis. Solstice SOCD 125.  
1996 – [ACC] Cancionero Musical de Palacio. Ensemble Accentus. Thomas Wimmer. Naxos 8.553536.  
1996 – [BIN] Sola m'ire. Cancionero de Palacio. Ensemble Gilles Binchois. Dominique Vellard. Virgin Veritas 45359.  
1996 – [FAG] All the King's Men. Henry VIII & the Princes of the Renaissance. I Fagiolini. Robert Hollingworth. Concordia. Mark Levy. Metronome 1012.  
1996 – [PIF] Los Ministriles. Spanish Renaissance Wind Music. Piffaro Renaissance Band. Joan Kimball, Robert Wiemken. Archiv 453 441.  
1996 – [RES] Resonanzen '96. Musik aus den Habsburgerlanden. Varios grupos. ORF "Edition Alte Musik" CD 091 (2 Cds).  
1997 – [RIC] A Ricolta Bubu – Medieval and Renaissance Music. Bob, Frank en Zussen. Pavane ADW 7391.  
1998 – [MIN] Court and Cathedral. The two worlds of Francisco de Peñalosa. Concentus Musicus Minnesota. Arthur Maud (composer). Meridian 84406.  
1998 – [JOU] Sephardic Journey. Spain and the Spanish Jews. La Rondinella. Dorian DOR 93 171.  
1998 – [FIC] De Antequara sale un moro. Musique de l'Espagne chrétienne, maure et juive vers 1492. Ensemble Música Ficta. Carlos Serrano. Jade 74 321 79256-2.  
1998 – [BEG] Cartas al Rey Moro. Begoña Olavide. Jubal JMPA 001.  
1998 – [UFF] Música no tempo das Caravelas. Música Antiga da UFF.
1999 – [VIR] Bella de vos som amorós. La Música en la Corte de los Reyes Católicos y Carlos I. Capella Virelai. Jordi Reguant. La mà de guido 2035.  
1999 – [SAV] La Folia, 1490–1701. Corelli, Marais, Martín y Coll, Ortiz, & Anónimos. Jordi Savall et al. Alia Vox AV 9805 (CD). Alia Vox AVSA 9805 (SACD-H).  
1999 – [UMB] Chacona. Renaissance Spain in the Age of Empire. Ex Umbris. Dorian 93207.  
2000 – [DIF] Diferencias – A Journey through Al-Andalus and Hispania. Codex Huelgas – Villancicos. Ensemble Diferencias. Conrad Steinmann. Divox Antiqua CDX-79809.  
2000 – [OAK] Piva. Renaissance Song of Italy and Spain. Duo LiveOak. Gyre Music 10032.  
2000 – [MAG] Plaser y gasajo. Música cortesana en tiempos del Papa Alejandro VI. Capella de Ministrers. Carles Magraner. Auvidis Ibèrica (Naïve) AVI 8027.  
2000 – [CAT] Carlos V. Mille Regretz: La Canción del Emperador. La Capella Reial de Catalunya y Hespèrion XXI. Jordi Savall. Alia Vox AV 9814 (CD). Alia Vox AVSA 9814 (SACD-H).  
2000 – [SPI] Pilgerwege. Freiburger Spielleyt. Verlag der Spielleute CD 0003.  
2000 – [MAY] Nunca fue pena mayor. Música Religiosa en torno al Papa Alejandro VI. Capella de Ministrers y Cor de la Generalitat Valenciana. Carles Magraner. Auvidis Ibèrica (Naïve) AVI 8026.  
2001 – [CON] Constantinople. Musique du Moyen Âge et de la Renaissance. Kiya Tabassian & Ensemble Constantinople. ATMA ACD2 2269.  
2001 – [GUI] Cançoner del duc de Calàbria. Duos i Exercicis sobre els vuit tons. In Canto. La mà de guido 2043.  
2001 – [TER] ¡Baylado!. Music of Renaissance Spain. The Terra Nova Consort. Dorian 90298.  
2001 – [ORL] Bread, Wine & Song. Music & Feasting in Renaissance Europe. Orlando Consort. Harmonia Mundi HMU 90 7314.  
2002 – [OLA] A las puertas de Granada. Begoña Olavide. Mudéjar. Jubal JMPA 005.  
2002 – [DUF] Cancionero. Music for the Spanish Court 1470–1520. The Dufay Collective. Avie AV0005.  
2002 – [WIM] Misteris de Dolor. Cantos sacros de Catalunya y Polifonía instrumental española – s. XVI-XVII. Accentus Austria. Thomas Wimmer. Pneuma PN-410.  
2003 – [PAN] La Conquista de Granada – Isabel la Católica. Las Cortes europeas, los Cancioneros y Musica Andalusi Nazari. Música Antigua. Eduardo Paniagua. Pneuma PN-660. 
2003 – [NOT] El Fuego. Musique polyphonique profane di Siècle d'Or. Música de la Corte. Eduardo Notrica. Voice of Lyrics VOL BL 703 
2004 – [CAP] Isabel I, Reina de Castilla. Luces y Sombras en el tiempo de la primera gran Reina del Renacimiento 1451–1504. La Capella Reial de Catalunya & Hespèrion XXI. Jordi Savall. Alia Vox AV 9838 (CD). Alia Vox AVSA 9838 (SACD-H).  
2004 – [CDM] Cancionero de Palacio. Capella de Ministrers. Carles Magraner. Licanus CDM 0409.  
2005 – [MAP] Música cortesana en la Europa de Juana I de Castilla 1479–1555. Las Cortes europeas y los Cancioneros. Musica Antigua. Eduardo Paniagua. Pneuma PN-710.  
2005 – [ROS] In Vino. Wine in music from the 15th and 16th centuries. La Rossignol. Tactus 400004.  
2006 – [REI] Christophorus Columbus. Paraísos Perdidos. Hespèrion XXI. La Capella Reial de Catalunya. Jordi Savall. Alia Vox AVSA 9850 A+B (2 SACD-H).  
2006 – [BOR] Borgia. Música religiosa en torno al papa Alejandro VI (1492–1503). Capella de Ministrers. Carles Magraner. Licanus CDM 0616.  
2006 – [CIB] La Spagna'''. Felipe I El Hermoso. Mecenas de la música europea. Camerata Iberia. Juan Carlos de Mulder. Open Music BS 059 CD

 Bibliography Historia de la música española. Vol 2. Desde el Ars Nova hasta 1600. Samuel Rubio. Alianza Editorial. Madrid. 1983
Commentaries by Josep Romeu y Figueras in the booklet of El cancionero de palacio: 1474–1516. J. Savall. Hespèrion XX.
Barbieri, Francisco Asenjo. Cancionero musical de los siglos XV y XVI. Real Academia de las Bellas Artes de San Fernando. 1890
Anglés, Higinio. La música en la corte de los Reyes Católicos, II, III, Polifonía profana: Cancionero Musical de Palacio (siglos XV-XVI), 2 vols. Monumentos de la Música Española, nos 5, 10. C.S.I.C. y Instituto Español de Musicología. Barcelona. 1947 y 1951.
 Historia de la Música en España e Hispanoamérica 2. De los Reyes Católicos a Felipe II''. Maricarmen Gómez (ed.). Fondo de Cultura Económica. Madrid-México D.F., 2012.

External links 

15th-century manuscripts
16th-century manuscripts
Chansonniers (books)
Renaissance music
Renaissance music manuscript sources
Spanish music history